Ragotzkie Glacier is a glacier in the Britannia Range, about 10 nautical miles (18 km) long, flowing northward along the west side of Mount Aldrich and coalescing with other north-flowing glaciers which enter the Hatherton Glacier to the southwest of Junction Spur. Named by Advisory Committee on Antarctic Names (US-ACAN) for Robert A. Ragotzkie, project director for United States Antarctic Research Program (USARP) studies of lakes in the ice-free valleys. He made personal studies in Victoria Land in the 1962–63 season.

Ragotzkie Icefall is an icefall 2.5 nautical miles (4.6 km) wide in the E-central part of Ragotzkie Glacier, Britannia Range. The icefall is a significant distributary of Ragotzkie ice to Alley Glacier, which occupies the valley to the east. Named by Advisory Committee on Antarctic Names (US-ACAN) in association with Ragotzkie Glacier.

Glaciers of Oates Land